Yachtley Crew (stylized as Yächtley Crëw, with a metal umlaut over the a and e) is an American yacht rock band from Los Angeles, California, formed in 2017. The band is known for wearing nautical attire on stage while playing 1970s and 1980s soft rock hits.

Soon after forming, Yachtley Crew quickly gained recognition and was voted 2018's "Best Cover Band" by OC Weekly who dubbed them "the Steel Panther of the high seas". On several occasions, they played with the original artists of the songs they frequently perform including Elliot Lurie of Looking Glass and Peter Beckett of Player. Las Vegas Review Journal hailed "It would be tempting to describe Yächtley Crëw simply as a cover band. But it is more. It is a trend-setter, a movement, an ocean spray to the face during the torrid summer months."

After limited touring in 2020 due to the COVID-19 pandemic, the band played their first national tour to sold out crowds across the United States in 2021.

Band Members

 Philly Ocean - Vocals
 Tommy Buoy - Guitar/Vocals
 Baba Buoy - Bass
 Sailor Hawkins - Drums/Vocals
 Stoney Shores - Synths
 Pauly Shores - Saxophone
 Matthew McDonald - Keys/Synths

References 

American soft rock music groups